Events from the year 1776 in Russia

Incumbents
 Monarch – Catherine II

Events

Births

Deaths

 
 Anna Vorontsova
 Natalia Alexeievna

References

1776 in Russia
Years of the 18th century in the Russian Empire